Vendlus Records is an American independent record label based in Washington, D.C. It was founded in 2002 by Joseph Cortese. Vendlus has released records in genres including black metal, indie pop, industrial, avant-garde metal, and electronica.

Artists
 Aerial Ruin (United States)
 Agalloch (United States)
 Arkhum (United States)
 Audiopain (Norway)
 Babyflesh (Norway)
 Brazzaville (United States/Spain)
 David Galas (United States)
 Denture (Norway)
 Diskord (Norway)
 Especially Likely Sloth (United States/Norway)
 Execration (Norway)
 Grayceon (United States)
 Havoc Unit (Finland)
 Island (Germany)
 Megaptera (Sweden)
 The Mist And The Morning Dew (Finland)
 Negru Voda (Sweden)
 Orgone (United States)
 Origami Galaktika (Norway)
 The Sin:Decay (Finland)
 Smohalla (France)
 Syven (Finland)
 Umoral (Norway)
 V:28 (Norway)
 Wolves in the Throne Room (United States)
 Zweizz (Norway)

Distribution
Main North American distribution is through Omega Distribution which is owned by The End Records this includes One Stop Distribution through Arrow.
International Distribution is handled through many outlets, most notable are:
Belgium - LSP Company 
England/Éire - Plastic Head Distribution 
Estonia - Nailboard Records 
Finland - Firebox Records
France - Season of Mist 
Hungary - Firebox Europe 
Bulgaria - Firebox Europe 
Romania - Firebox Europe 
Norway - Aftermath Music 
Poland - Foreshadow 
Greece - SoundForge

See also
 List of record labels

External links
 Vendlus Records Discogs Profile

Record labels established in 2002
American independent record labels
Black metal record labels
Industrial record labels
Experimental music record labels
Electronic music record labels
2002 establishments in the United States